James Tien Pei-chun, GBS, OBE, JP (born 8 January 1947) is the former chairman and Leader of the Liberal Party (LP) and former member of the Legislative Council of Hong Kong (Legco). Coming from the background of an entrepreneur, he was also a non-official member of the Executive Council of Hong Kong (Exco), member of Central and Western and Kwai Tsing District Council and Hong Kong member to the Chinese People's Political Consultative Conference (CPPCC).

Son of the textile entrepreneur-turned-politician Francis Tien, James was appointed to public offices since the 1980s, where he sat on the Hong Kong Basic Law Consultative Committee (BLCC) and was appointed to the Legislative Council in 1988. He returned to the LegCo in 1993 through a by-election in the Industrial (First) functional constituency nominated by the Federation of Hong Kong Industries (FHKI).

He succeeded Allen Lee to become the chairman of the Liberal Party in 1998 and was appointed to the Executive Council by Chief Executive Tung Chee-hwa in 2002. His popularity rose to peak when he resigned from the ExCo in 2003 in opposition to the Basic Law Article 23 which brought down the proposed legislation. He ran a successful campaign in the 2004 LegCo geographical constituency direct election but was defeated in 2008 and resigned from his party offices.

He threw his weight behind Henry Tang in the 2012 Chief Executive election and had been critical of the eventual winner Leung Chun-ying after the election. His vocal opposition to Leung saw his CPPCC membership being stripped away, making him the first person in history to have received this sanction. He served one more term on the LegCo from 2012 to 2016.

Early life and family
Tien was born in 1947 in Shanghai and moved to Hong Kong two years later with his family. His father, Francis Tien, was a successful clothing merchant, owning textile factories in Hong Kong and was appointed member of the Legislative Council and many consultative bodies for the colonial government in the 1960s and 70s. James Tien's younger brother Michael Tien owns the fashion chain G2000 and was chairman of the Kowloon-Canton Railway Corporation before it merged with the Mass Transit Railway Corporation.

He was educated at the Diocesan Boys' School. He traveled to the United States to study chemical engineering at the University of Illinois at Urbana–Champaign when he was 17 years old and met his wife Mary, a Vietnamese-Chinese, in college. In 1970, the couple returned to Hong Kong and he worked for his father in the factories.

Political career

Early ventures and Legislative Councillor
He was first appointed member of the Kwai Tsing District Board in 1985 as a representative of the business sector as his factories were in Kwai Chung. He was appointed to the Hong Kong Basic Law Consultative Committee (BLCC) which oversaw the drafting of the post-1997 Hong Kong Basic Law in 1985. He was part of the Group of 89, the conservative faction of the Committee members consisting of mostly businessmen and professionals elites. In 1990, Tien joined the two pro-business conservative political groups, the Business and Professionals Federation of Hong Kong and the Liberal Democratic Federation of Hong Kong evolved out of the Group of 89.

He was first appointed to the Legislative Council in 1988, in which he served until 1991 when the first Legislative Council direct election was introduced in 1991. In 1993 when Stephen Cheong, member of the Legislative Council, representing the Industrial (First) functional constituency, died of heart attack, the Federation of Hong Kong Industries nominated Tien to replace Cheong. In 1993, he co-founded the pro-business Liberal Party which was established by the business sector in the legislature countering the liberal faction of the United Democrats of Hong Kong after its landslide victory in the 1991 Legislative Council election. In 1996, he was elected member of the Beijing-controlled Provisional Legislative Council, to counter the last colonial Legislative Council elected in 1995, making him one of the members of both Legislative Councils at the same time.

In the first SAR Legislative Council election in 1998, he ran in the Commercial (First) functional constituency representing Hong Kong General Chamber of Commerce's approximately 4,000 members. Tien was elected uncontestedly by the chamber. He became Chairman of the Liberal Party after the resignation of its first leader, Allen Lee, in December 1998 after Lee suffered his defeat in the New Territories East geographical constituency direct election.

He was also Chairman of the Hong Kong General Chamber of Commerce, a most influential chamber of commerce in Hong Kong between 1996 and 1997. He is also a general committee member of both the Hong Kong General Chamber of Commerce and the Federation of Hong Kong Industries.

Liberal Party Chairman and Executive Councillor
Tien joined the Executive Council, Chief Executive Tung Chee-hwa's cabinet, in July 2002 as Chairman of the Liberal Party, following the reorganisation of the Council under the new Principal Officials Accountability System of the Chief Executive. Although being the ally of the Tung administration, James Tien openly aired his displeasure of the skimpy political rewards meted out by Tung and advocated power sharing with the government. Tien was also a member of the National Committee of the Chinese People's Political Consultative Conference from 2003 until 2014.

After one year, on 6 July 2003, Tien announced his resignation from the Executive Council, when his calls to delay the controversial legislation of the Article 23 of the Basic Law were rejected after more than 500,000 people marched against the legislation. His resignation ultimately led to the withdrawal of the legislation and break-up of the "ruling alliance" of the Chief Executive, causing his popularity and that of the Liberal Party to surge. Capitalizing on the surge of popularity, Tien made his first attempt in the direct election by running in the New Territories East geographical constituency direct elections for the first time in the 2004 Legislative Council elections. In the 2005 Chief Executive election, the announcement that his ally Henry Tang had dropped out of the race was further bad news for the party. He initially said that he might stand for selection as Chief Executive, but ultimately did not. Donald Tsang was uncontestedly elected in the election. In 2007, Tien supported Tsang's second term. Tsang appointed Tien to be the Chairman of the Hong Kong Tourism Board after he was re-elected.

Tien lost his seat in the 2008 Legislative Council elections, when the Liberal Party lost all its geographical constituency seats, and he subsequently announced that he would not stand again for Legco. He also resigned as Chairman of the Liberal Party alongside Vice-chairwoman Selina Chow who lost her seat in New Territories West. After Tien's resignation, the Liberal Party was in the leadership crisis, as four of the seven Legislative Councillors quit the party over internal party disagreements. Miriam Lau eventually took over as chairwoman and Tien was made Honorary Chairman in December 2010 after another internal party struggle involved with his brother Michael Tien and Vice-chairman Tommy Cheung over the minimum wage legislation, which saw Michael quit the party as a result.

Second tenure in Legco
Tien threw his weight behind Henry Tang in the 2012 Chief Executive election. After it was clear that the Beijing authorities favoured Leung Chun-ying over Tang, Tien advocated his party to cast blank vote instead of voting for Leung. In September, Tien went back on his previous undertaking and successfully re-claimed the New Territories East seat in the 2012 Legislative Council elections. In May 2013, the party elected Tien to the new position of Leader of the Liberal Party.

Tien was one of the most vocal opponent of the Leung Chun-ying administration. During the 2014 Hong Kong protests, Tien called on Chief Executive Leung to resign, leading to the CPPCC hearing a call to eject him as a member. Tien was formally stripped of his post at the meeting on 29 October, making him the first person in history to have received this sanction. Tien stepped down from his position as the Leader of the Liberal Party after the removal.

In the 2016 Legislative Council election, James Tien ran a campaign against the second term of the Chief Executive Leung Chun-ying. He stood as a second candidate on his young party colleague Dominic Lee's ticket. The ticket gained 20,031 votes, around 3 per cent of the vote share and both of them were not elected. In the 2017 Chief Executive election, Tien again went against the tide, to support John Tsang whose candidacy was widely considered to be opposed by the Beijing government. He became the first member in the Election Committee to handed his nomination to Tsang. Tsang eventually received 365 votes, losing to Beijing-favoured Carrie Lam in the final election.

Post-Legco Life
After the 2019 Yuen Long attack, James Tien called for the resignation of Carrie Lam as Chief Executive for Hong Kong.

Controversies
On 11 October 2007, it was reported that Tien had accepted MTRC CEO Chow Chung-kong's sincere apology after the latter backed Civic Party barrister Tanya Chan Suk-chong against Liberal Party lawyer and incumbent Mark Lin Man-kit in the district council election for the Peak district.

Tien explained that Chow would have to bear all the political consequences for his choice of backing a rival party's candidate. Tien made clear that he was personally infuriated by Chow's unfriendly act despite the Liberal Party's loyalty and consistent support for the rail company. Tien further stated that the MTRC would face probable dissent from Liberal members in future matters involving MTRC inside district councils.

Tien backed down on 12 October 2007 by sincerely apologising to both Chow and the public.

See also
 Michael Tien

References

1947 births
Living people
Hong Kong textiles industry businesspeople
Members of the Executive Council of Hong Kong
District councillors of Central and Western District
Politicians from Shanghai
Officers of the Order of the British Empire
Grainger College of Engineering alumni
Liberal Party (Hong Kong) politicians
Recipients of the Gold Bauhinia Star
Businesspeople from Shanghai
New Hong Kong Alliance politicians
Liberal Democratic Federation of Hong Kong politicians
Business and Professionals Federation of Hong Kong politicians
Progressive Hong Kong Society politicians
Members of the National Committee of the Chinese People's Political Consultative Conference
District councillors of Kwai Tsing District
Members of the Provisional Legislative Council
HK LegCo Members 1988–1991
HK LegCo Members 1991–1995
HK LegCo Members 1995–1997
HK LegCo Members 1998–2000
HK LegCo Members 2000–2004
HK LegCo Members 2004–2008
HK LegCo Members 2012–2016
Hong Kong Basic Law Consultative Committee members
Members of the Election Committee of Hong Kong, 2012–2017
Members of the Election Committee of Hong Kong, 2017–2021
20th-century Chinese politicians
21st-century Chinese politicians
20th-century Hong Kong people
21st-century Hong Kong people